Tramaine Dashon Williams (born November 2, 1992) is an American professional boxer who held the IBF-USBA and WBO-NABO junior featherweight titles from 2019 to July 2020.

Professional career
Williams challenged Angelo Leo for his WBO junior featherweight title on August 1, 2020, being a replacement with three days notice after Stephen Fulton tested positive for COVID-19.  Before becoming the replacement, Williams was to be on the Leo-Fulton undercard fighting in a WBA title eliminator with Ra'eese Aleem.  Williams lost the fight by unanimous decision.

Professional boxing record

References

External links

1992 births
Living people
American male boxers
Super-bantamweight boxers
Featherweight boxers
Southpaw boxers
African-American boxers